Arbeca is a village in the comarca of Les Garrigues, in the province of Lleida, in Catalonia, Spain.

It is the third village of Les Garrigues in number of inhabitants, close to Les Borges Blanques and Juneda.
The population is about 2,500 and the village has given its name to arbequina olives, used to produce a highly valued olive oil for human consumption, grown  not only in Les Garrigues but also in many places in Spain, such as Andalusia.
The economy of the village is basically agrarian, with the cultivation on its irrigated and unirrigated land of almonds, cereals, pears, apples, olives, peaches, etc.

Arbeca is situated in the north-northeast of Les Garrigues, near the comarques of  Pla d'Urgell and Urgell, and about 30 kilometers from Lleida, the capital of the province of the same name.

References

External links 
Web site of Arbeca's town council
 Government data pages 

Municipalities in Garrigues (comarca)
Populated places in Garrigues (comarca)